In United States telecommunication law, the Modification of Final Judgment (MFJ) is the August 1982 consent decree concerning the American Telephone & Telegraph Company (AT&T) and its subsidiaries.  The terms required the Bell System divestiture – removing local telephone service from AT&T control and putting business restrictions on the divested local telephone companies – in exchange for removing other longstanding restrictions on what businesses AT&T could control.

The decree replaced the entirety of the previous final judgment of January 24, 1956 in the case United States of America v. Western Electric Company, Incorporated, and American Telephone and Telegraph Company, also known as United States v. Western Electric Co. which had been transferred to the United States District Court for the District of Columbia and is referred to in the MFJ as the Western Electric case, and consolidated with the existing United States v. AT&T filed on November 20, 1974, which is referred to in the MFJ as the AT&T action or AT&T case.

The decree was made with Harold H. Greene as presiding judge.

References 

1982 in technology
1982 in United States case law
Bell System
United States antitrust case law
United States communications regulation case law